The Zóbel de Ayala clan is a prominent Filipino family of Spanish and Austrian descent who were the founders of Ayala y Compañía (now Ayala Corporation) and patrons of the Premio Zóbel literary awards. The clan is directly descended from Jacobo Zóbel y Zangroniz (1842–1896) and Trinidad de Ayala (1856–1918). Ayala y Compañía (established in 1876) traces its origins to Casa Róxas, a business partnership established in 1834 between Domingo Róxas (1792–1843) and Antonio de Ayala (1803–1876).

History

Jacobo Zóbel (1842–1896)
Jacobo Zóbel y Zangroniz was the son of Jakob Hinsch Zóbel and Ana Maria Zangroniz (daughter of a justice at the Real Audiencia of Manila, who had come from an old family in Navarra, Spain). He was born on October 12, 1842 and was the first Zóbel born in the Philippines. His grandfather, Johannes Andreas Zóbel, arrived in the Philippines from Hamburg, Germany in 1832, together with his wife, Cornelia Hinsch, and their son, Jakob. Johannes Andreas Zóbel came from a long line of German pharmacists and established the Botica Zóbel pharmacy in 1834, located in 28 Calle Real in Intramuros.

Zóbel was sent to Hamburg, Germany for his primary education (1848 to 1859) and continued his higher studies at the Universidad Central de Madrid, taking up natural sciences. It was there he explored his lifelong fascination with medicine, chemistry and archaeology. In doing so, he mastered eleven languages. He befriended the young numismatist Don Antonio Delgado (1805-1879) from Madrid, who inspired his scholarship on antiquarian coins. He traveled to several museums in Europe to research more about his collecting hobby and he published the classic monograph titled "Memoria Sobre Las Monedas Libiofenicias o Teudetanas" which is still published and used in Spanish universities to this day. He graduated from the university in 1864 and returned to Manila to assume management of Botica Zóbel.

Brought up as a liberal, Zóbel welcomed his appointment by Governor General Carlos de la Torre as a member of the Manila Municipal Board and the Sociedad Económica de los Amigos del País. During his term, Zóbel introduced many liberal reforms: public schools, the first tree-planting activities and campaigned for representation in the Spanish Cortes. He also opened the first public reading room and library during his term. 

Because of his many liberal ideas, Zóbel became a suspect following the Cavite Mutiny of 1872. On September 22, 1874, he was imprisoned in Fort Santiago for several months on the charge of sedition. He was cited also for possession of firearms and revolutionary pamphlets. The Prince of Bismarck made representations to the Spanish government to have him released. He was acquitted in February 1875 by the Real Audiencia of Manila for lack of evidence.

Zóbel married Trinidad de Ayala (1856–1918) on February 5, 1875. The couple took a whirlwind honeymoon trip to Japan, San Francisco, the World's Fair of 1876, and Europe, where their children were born. The couple decided to live briefly in Spain after Jacobo decided to study transportation systems in Europe, and he renewed his numismatic research, publishing a major work entitled Estudio Histórico de la Moneda Antigua Española Desde Su Origen Hasta El Imperio Romano in 1878.

Sometime in 1880, the couple returned to Manila. He became a representative of Eiffel et Cie of Paris and built the Ayala Bridge in Manila. Ayala y Compañia (the successor-in-interest to Casa Róxas) was established in 1876 and Zóbel became one of its partners until 1891.

He was appointed member of the Consejo de Administración by the King of Spain on May 25, 1882. He was also member of the Sociedad Económica de los Amigos del País, a conciliario (adviser) of Banco Español Filipino and the secretary of the Cámara de Comercio de Manila. He became a member of the prestigious Real Academia de la Historia from 1865 to 1896. He received numerous awards, including the Gran Cruz de la Real Orden Americana de Isabel la Catolica in 1880, the Caballero de la Orden de Carlos III, and knight-commander of the Order of the Northern Star of Sweden and Norway.

On December 1885, Zóbel established the first tram system in Manila, the Manila-Tondo line, which extended to Malabon and was powered by steam. His capitalist partner was the Spanish banker Don Adolfo Bayo and his local partner was one of the richest Filipinos of the time, Don Gonzalo Tuason. Eventually, he built four other major tram lines in Manila and its vicinity (Malate, Sampaloc to Tondo), drawn by horses.

Zóbel died on October 7, 1896, while under suspicion once again of supporting the Philippine revolution.

Trinidad de Ayala (1856–1918)
Trinidad de Ayala was the youngest daughter of Antonio de Ayala and Margarita Róxas (the eldest child of Domingo Róxas y Ureta). She was very supportive of her husband's liberal causes, a trait she inherited from her mother. She was very much interested in the arts and she cultivated singing. La Ilustración Filipina magazine reported on March 28, 1892 that she was invited to sing in Malacañang with other sopranos of the period.

In 1898, upon the death of her husband and with her brother-in-law, Pedro Pablo Róxas (1847–1913), away in Paris, France, Ayala divested her husband's tramcar and pharmacy businesses, and various assets of Ayala y Compañia. Showing extreme astuteness, she redeployed capital into marketable securities in hotels and trade, which later boomed after the Philippine–American War and World War I. She increased the family's holdings in Banco Español Filipino, bought into The Hong Kong & Shanghai Banking Company Ltd. and invested in Hong Kong real estate. Under her stewardship, Banco Español Filipino expanded into branch banking, opening an office in Iloilo City. She funded the development of Manila's first community water system, known as the Carriedo waterworks.

In 1898, she led Ayala y Compañía into its first real estate development. Upon the death of her brother-in-law Pedro Pablo Róxas in 1912, she took over his interests in Ayala y Compañia. In 1914, she gave Hacienda San Pedro de Macati to her grandchildren – Jacobo Zóbel, Alfonso Zóbel and Mercedes Zóbel (the children of her son Enrique with his first wife, Consuelo). She died in 1918 at the age of 62.

Descendants
Jacobo Zóbel and Trinidad de Ayala had five children – Fernando Antonio A. Zóbel (1876–1949); twins Enrique (1877–1943) and Alfonso (1877–1882); Margarita (1881–1963); and Gloria – who were the first-generation Zóbel de Ayalas. Among the children, Fernando Antonio and Enrique would assume leadership of Ayala y Compañía. Enrique's descendants would inherit Ayala y Compañía after his death in 1943. After the end of World War II, the family's fortunes would increase with the development of Hacienda San Pedro de Macati.

In 1968, Ayala y Compañía shifted from a partnership to a corporation, becoming Ayala Corporation.

Bloodline

Domingo Róxas (1792-1843) m. Maria Saturnina Ubaldo
 Margarita Róxas (1826-1869)  m. Antonio de Ayala (1803-1876)
 Camilla de Ayala m. Andres Ortiz de Zarate 
 Carmen de Ayala (d. 1930) m. Pedro Pablo (Perico) Róxas (1847-1912)
 Consuelo Róxas de Ayala (1877-1908) m. Enrique Zóbel de Ayala (1877-1943)
 José Róxas de Ayala
 Margarita Róxas de Ayala m. Eduardo Soriano y Sanz
 Pedro Róxas de Ayala
 Antonio Róxas de Ayala
 Trinidad de Ayala (1856-1918) m. Jacobo Zóbel y Zangroniz (1842-1896)  (see Family Tree)
 Fernando Antonio Zóbel de Ayala (1876-1949) 
 Enrique Zóbel de Ayala (1877-1943) m. Consuelo Róxas de Ayala (1877-1908); m. Fermina Montojo (1881-1966)
 Alfonso Zóbel de Ayala  (1877-1882) (twin of Enrique)
 Margarita Zóbel de Ayala m. Antonio Melian y Pavia (1879-1956) 
 Gloria Zóbel de Ayala
 José Bonifacio Róxas (1834-1888) m. Juana de Castro
 Pedro Pablo (Perico) Róxas  (1847-1912) m. Carmen de Ayala (d. 1930)
 Mariano Róxas

Family tree

Jacobo Zóbel y Zangroniz (1842-1896)  m. Trinidad de Ayala (1856-1918) 
Fernando Antonio Zóbel de Ayala (1876-1949) 
Enrique Zóbel de Ayala (1877-1943) m. Consuelo Róxas de Ayala (1877-1908); m. Fermina Montojo (1881-1966)
Jacobo Zóbel de Ayala y Róxas (1902-1971) m. Angela Olgado; m. Sachiko Morita
Enrique J. Zóbel (1927-2004) m. Rocío Urquijo (1935-2009); m. Dee Anne Hora
Jacobo Santiago (Santi) U. Zóbel (1954-1965) 
Mercedes (Dedes) U. Zóbel m. Carlo Pessina
Iñigo U. Zóbel m. María Cristina Cardenas
Alfonso Zóbel de Ayala y Róxas (1903-1967) m. Carmen Pfitz (1909-1999)
María Victoria (Vicky) Zóbel de Ayala m. Juan Antonio Vallejo-Nágera (1926-1990)
Alejandra Z.Vallejo-Nágera
Iñigo Z. Vallejo-Nágera
María Z. Vallejo-Nágera
Jaime Zóbel de Ayala m. Beatriz Miranda 
Jaime Augusto Zóbel de Ayala II m. Elizabeth Eder
Fernando Zóbel de Ayala m. Catherine Marie Silverio
Beatriz Susana (Bea Jr.) Zóbel m. Juan Urquijo Fernández de Araoz (d. 1995)
Patricia Zóbel  m. Juan Enrique de Herrera García Moriyón (?); m. Alonso Halffter Caro
Cristina Zóbel m. Ignacio Suárez de Puga Fontes
Monica Zóbel m. Guillermo Pla Otáñez
Sofia Zóbel m. Francisco R. Elizalde
Alfonso (Alfonsito) Zóbel de Ayala, Jr.
Mercedes Zóbel de Ayala y Róxas (1907-2005) m. Joseph McMicking (1908-1990)
Matilde Zóbel de Ayala y Montojo  m. Luis Albarracin Segura
Consuelo Zóbel de Ayala y Montojo (1914-1990)  m. James D. Alger (1912-1986)
Gloria Zóbel de Ayala y Montojo  m. Ricardo Padilla y Satrustegui
Georgina Z. Padilla m. Luis Mac-Crohon y Garay
Alejandro Z. Padilla
Fernando M. Zóbel (1924-1984) 
Alfonso Zóbel de Ayala  (1877-1882) (twin of Enrique)
Margarita Zóbel de Ayala m. Antonio Melián y Pavía, 4th Count of Peracamps (1879-1923-1957) 
Sylvia Z. Melián
Leopoldo Melián, 5th Count of Peracamps (1910-1978) m. María Natividad Ugarte y Aboitiz (1916-2018)
Margarita Melián (1948) m. 1975 Ignacio Ricardo Ortigas
Enrique Melián, 6th Count of Peracamps (1955)
Eduardo Z. Melián
Raul Z. Melián
Elena Z. Melián (1915-1925)
Alfredo Z. Melián (1916-1991)  m. Almudt Schmidt (1921-1946)  m. Mary Dolores Randolph Magda (1926-2016)
Cristobal S. Melián (1946) m. Marianne Heiberg (1945-2004)
Arturo R. Melián (1957)
Victoria R. Melián (1958-2021) m. Luis Marsans Astoreca (1952-2004)
Eugenia R. Melián (1960)
Sylvia R. Melián (1962)
Gloria Zóbel de Ayala

Ayala Corporation

The Zóbel de Ayalas are among several Filipino families listed in Forbes list of the world's richest people. The family owns and controls Ayala Corporation, the country's largest and oldest conglomerate that includes the Bank of the Philippine Islands, Ayala Land Inc., the Manila Water Company, and Globe Telecom, one of the largest mobile phone networks in the Philippines. Ayala Corporation was formerly known as Ayala y Compañia (established in 1876) which evolved from a series of partnerships beginning with Casa Róxas, a partnership established in 1834 between Domingo Róxas and Antonio de Ayala. In 1968, Ayala y Compañia shifted from a partnership to a corporation, becoming Ayala Corporation. At present, the family continues to hold the controlling stake in the company through its holding company Mermac, Inc.

San Miguel Corporation
Iñigo U. Zóbel is the majority shareholder and chairman of Top Frontier Investment Holdings, Inc., the largest and controlling shareholder of San Miguel Corporation.

Public service

 In 1929, Enrique Zóbel de Ayala established the Premio Zóbel to recognize the best written works in the Spanish language in the Philippines.
 The Ayala Foundation (formerly, Filipinas Foundation) envisions communities where people are productive, creative, self-reliant, and proud to be Filipino.
 The Consuelo Foundation was established by Consuelo Zóbel Alger. It operates and supports programs in Hawaii and the Philippines that prevent and treat abuse, neglect and the exploitation of children, women and families.

Legacy and honors

The De La Salle-Santiago Zóbel School was named after Jacobo Santiago "Santi" Zóbel (1954–1965), the eldest son of Enrique J. Zóbel and Rocío Urquijo.

"Jaime Zóbel de Ayala and family" are among the three Filipino families included in the Forbes list of the "World's Richest Families".

The 2007 Harvard Alumni Achievement Award was awarded to Jaime Augusto Zóbel de Ayala, chairman of Ayala Corporation, for his exemplary leadership in business. It is the highest honor of the Harvard Business School. He was the first Filipino and the youngest alumnus to be so honored.

Jaime Zóbel de Ayala was awarded with the Philippine Legion of Honor, Rank of Grand Commander on December 24, 2009. Jaime Augusto Zóbel de Ayala II and Fernando Zóbel de Ayala were awarded with the Philippine Legion of Honor, Rank of Grand Commander on June 29, 2010.

Notable members
 Enrique Zóbel de Ayala
 Fernando Zóbel
 Col. Jacobo Zóbel
 Col. Joseph McMicking
 Mercedes Zóbel McMicking
 Consuelo Zóbel Alger
 Enrique J. Zóbel
 Jaime Zóbel  
 Jaime Augusto Zóbel de Ayala II 
 Fernando Zóbel de Ayala

References

External links 
 Ayala Corporation
 Ayala at 175 Magazine
 Ayala Foundation
 The Joseph & Mercedes McMicking Foundation
 Enrique Zobel Foundation
 Consuelo Foundation

 
Filipino people of German descent
Filipino people of Basque descent
Filipino people of Spanish descent
Harvard University people
Business families